Inktomi was a California-based online company.

Inktomi may also refer to:

 Inktomi (crater), a crater on Saturn's moon Rhea
 an alternate spelling of Iktomi, Lakota spider-trickster god